Emil Norlander (1865-1935) was a Swedish journalist, author, songwriter and producer of musical revues.

Career
Originally a dentist, by the late 1890s Norlander was working as a columnist on a Stockholm newspaper. Following this, he became a contributing writer and editor of the humor magazines Nya Nisse and Kasper. He wrote more than twenty books, the most famous being Anderssonskans Kalle (Anderson's Charlie), the tale of a mischievous boy in turn-of-the-century Stockholm.

Starting in 1899, Norlander wrote and produced over sixty revues as well as many popular comedies. His most famous revue was Den förgyllda lergöken (The gilded toy ocarina).  He wrote the lyrics for many comic songs, including Fia Jansson and Amanda Lundbom. His New Year's variety shows were held at Södra Teatern, one of Stockholm's most prestigious venues.

After 1920 Norlander's popularity waned as the Swedish public embraced a new generation of entertainers. His last big hit was Den gula paviljongen (The yellow pavilion) in 1923. When the "Revue King" finally retired, he was succeeded by Karl Gerhard and Ernst Rolf.

Songs
During his lengthy career Norlander wrote the lyrics for hundreds of songs, collaborating with Kal Dompan, David Hellström, Arthur Högstedt, John Redland, Max Uyma and other Swedish composers. For some of his songs he borrowed well-known melodies from abroad: Fredssång (Silver Threads Among The Gold), Lycklige John (Lucky Jim) and Kärlek På Italienska Och Svenska 
(Santa Lucia).
 
In a rare departure from musical comedy, Norlander penned the lyrics to Fredssång (Peace Song), which begins with the lines: Varför skola mänskor strida, varför skall det flyta blod. (Why should people fight, why should blood flow.) This pacifist anthem, written at the time of the First World War, has been recorded numerous times and published in a variety of songbooks.  The singer Sven-Bertil Taube released a memorable version of the song in 1972.

In the 1910s and 1920s Emil Norlander was introduced to Swedish-American audiences through recordings on the Columbia, Edison and Victor labels. Among those recording his songs in America were Ingeborg Laudon, Bert Leman, Gösta Nyström, Elis Olson-Ellis, Hjalmar Peterson, Calle Sjöquist and Charles G. Widdén. Elis Olson-Ellis, the lead actor in several of Norlander's revues, toured the United States during the 1911-1912 season. During his stay he recorded two Norlander songs for Victor Records. Emil Norlander's "Manicuristvisan" (The Manicurist Song), which Olson-Ellis set to music, was later recorded by Calle Sjöquist for Columbia Records.

Selected revues

The following shows were produced by Emil Norlander.

 1899 - Den stora strejken
 1900 - Den förgyllda lergöken
 1901 - Prinsessan Habbahabba
 1902 - I sjunde himlen
 1903 - Damen med masken
 1903 - Jönsson, Jonsson, Jansson
 1903 - Gubben i Renberget
 1904 - Kovander, Bovander & C:i
 1905 - Stockholmsluft
 1905 - Bluff
 1906 - Kalle Munter
 1907 - Stackars Olson
 1907 - Mångubben
 1908 - N:r 30 Gustafsson
 1908 - Johnsons 7 fruar
 1909 - Konstgjorda Svensson
 1909 - Nick Carter
 1910 - Tokiga Amelie
 1910 - Tre jobbande pojkar
 1911 - Spasmiga Wahlund 
 1912 - Stockholmsgask
 1912 - Stockholmsgreker
 1913 - Sankt Jönsson och Draken
 1914 - Stockholmsflugor
 1915 - Stockholm runt på 140 minuter
 1915 - Restaurant Pumpen
 1916 - Stockholmsjobb
 1917 - Teaterflugan
 1917 - Malla
 1918 - Tokstollar
 1918 - Filmkungen
 1919 - Tutti-Frutti
 1919 - Lev livet leende
 1920 - Cirkus Jönsson
 1922 - Venuspassagen
 1922 - Med pukor och trumpeter
 1923 - Kungarevyn
 1924 - Festprissar
 1925 - Genom kikaren
 1926 - Slag i slag

Gallery

References

External links 

Emil Norlander on Victor Records.
Emil Norlander at Swedish music and film.
Elis Olson-Ellis at Swedish Wikipedia
Images
Anderssonskans Kalle movie poster 1934  
Emil Norlander at the National Library of Sweden.
Emil Norlander at the National Archives of Sweden.
Hund På Katt from the 1911 revue "Spasmiga Wahlund" (Excitable Wahlund). 
Project Runeberg  
Rännstensungar och storborgare (Children of the gutter and prominent citizens)
Song texts
Amanda Lundbom
Balen på bakgården
Den gula paviljongen
Fia Jansson
Varför skola mänskor strida
Songbook
Emil Norlander songbook
Streaming audio
Emil Norlander at the Internet Archive. 
Swedish labor songs at the Internet Archive.
Den gula paviljongen at the Library of Congress.
Emil Norlander at the National Library of Sweden.
Sockerdricka from the 1911 revue "Spasmiga Wahlund" (Excitable Wahlund).  
Videos

Musicians from Stockholm
Swedish comedy writers
Swedish entertainers
Swedish journalists
Swedish songwriters
Swedish-language writers
1935 deaths
1865 births